Teresa Lourenco (born January 25, 1981) is a Trinidadian model, and actress.

Early life and education
Lourenço was born on January 25, 1981 in Trinidad. In 1994, she moved with her mother to Hamburg, Germany, where, at the age of 14, she was discovered by a modeling scout. At 16, she won the "Les Trophees de la Mode" in Paris for Best New Face.

Career
Lourenco signed a contract with Hamburg agency Mega-Models and went to Paris. In 1995, John Galliano engaged her for his Dior shows. Lourenco then won the International Design Award as the best new generation model. Lourenco has worked with American designer Tommy Hilfiger, as well as Gap, Victoria's Secret, Valentino, and Christian Dior.  She has been on the cover of Vogue, Cosmopolitan, Elle, and Harper's Bazaar. Additionally, she has been the featured model in music videos by artists Lenny Kravitz and Babyface for their songs "Again" and "There She Goes" respectively.

In 2010, she signed with "Expecting Models" and worked with top maternity companies like Loved and Lavish (Heidi Klum), Motherhood Maternity and Thyme Maternity. She's signed with Model Management in Hamburg. Her stats are listed as 5'10.5" and 35-23-35.

Filmography

Music video

Personal life
Lourenco currently lives in New York City. She is married to Marcus Antebi, founder of Juice Press.

References

1981 births
Living people
Trinidad and Tobago female models